Li Daoxi (Chinese name, 李道熙) (1920–2007) was a well-known Chinese painter and calligrapher. He was a prestigious member of the Beijing Academy of Painting and Calligraphy and also Chairman of Leshan Artists Association. His works are widely reported by private Chinese media like Sina.com, Tencent, Sohu.com, 163.com, as well as the state media agency China Central Television. Li Daoxi is particularly famous for painting objects like goats, flowers and birds. His paintings have been collected by Deng Xiaoping, Jiang Zemin, Jia Qinglin, Li Changchun, Li Peng, Qiao Shi, Wei Jianxing, Zhang Xuezhong and US Ambassador to China Leonard Woodcock.

Major events 
 1979–1980, painting gifts for Deng Xiaoping at Jinniu Hotel, Chengdu, China
 1992, was invited to Tiananmen Square for painting
 1996, was invited to Zhongnanhai for painting and presented paintings to Zhu Rongji, then-Prime Minister of China
 1999, painting gifts for Li Peng, China's Prime Minister
 2000, painting for Li Lanqing, Vice Premier of the State Council of the People's Republic of China
 2003, painting "Ram" as gifts for Jia Qinglin (7th Chairman of the National Committee of the CPPCC) and Li Changchun (Chairman of the CPC Central Guidance Commission for Building Spiritual Civilization)
 2005, calligraphy and paintings for Tung Chee-hwa (Former Chief Executive of Hong Kong)
 2006, 12 paintings for Jiang Zemin, former President of China.

References

Further reading

External links 
 Gallery at Artnet

1920 births
2007 deaths
Painters from Sichuan
People of the Republic of China
People from Leshan